Exelastis ebalensis is a moth of the family Pterophoridae. It is known from Socotra, Yemen.

References

Exelastini
Fauna of Socotra
Moths described in 1907